Frysk Hynder Single Malt is a Dutch single malt whisky, distilled and bottled in the Frisian Us Heit Distillery. Frysk Hynder (Frisian horse) is the first single malt produced in the Netherlands, and started off as a hobby project in the Us Heit beer brewery. The daily production is only 77 bottles.

See also
Whisky
List of whiskey brands

References

Alcoholic drink brands